Jessie Cleveland Maddox (April 5, 1932 – January 29, 2009) was an American politician who served two separate stints in the Georgia House of Representatives.

Early life and education
Maddox was born in Jackson, Georgia, in 1932. He graduated from Porterdale High School in 1949.

After three years of service in the United States Coast Guard, Maddox briefly attended West Georgia College, and then earned his Bachelor of Science from the University of Georgia in 1957. In 1961, he obtained his Bachelor of Laws degree from Atlanta's John Marshall Law School. That year, he became a partner at his law own office, the Chance & Maddox Firm.

Political career
A Democrat, Maddox was first elected to the Georgia House of Representatives in 1964. He served a single term, midway through which the state redistricted to better equalize population across districts.

After leaving office, Maddox continued to practice law and served as a judge on the Cherokee Judicial Circuit in 1978. He also served as Chairman of the Gordon County Board of Commissioners.

Maddox returned to the state house in 1982, serving an additional two terms. In his final term, he sat on three committees: Banks & Banking, Special Judiciary, and Transportation.

Personal life
Maddox died on January 29, 2009, at Gordon Hospital in Calhoun, Georgia. He was survived by his wife of 54 years.

References

1932 births
Democratic Party members of the Georgia House of Representatives
20th-century American politicians
2009 deaths